Zaporizhzhia or Zaporozhzhia is a historical region in central east Ukraine below the Dnieper River rapids, hence the name, literally "(territory) beyond the rapids".

From the 16th to the 18th centuries the Zaporizhzhia region functioned as semi-independent quasi-republican Cossack territory centred on the Zaporizhian Sich. Sometimes the region is referred to as Zaporizhian Sich as well. Zaporizhzhia corresponds to modern Dnipropetrovsk Oblast, major parts of Zaporizhzhia and Kirovohrad Oblasts, as well as parts of Kherson and Donetsk Oblasts of Ukraine.

Names
The region was officially known as Free lands of the Lower Zaporizhzhia Host ((Wild Fields or Wild Plain)). Among other names, it was called as Wild Fields, Novorossiya (in Russia), and others.

Origin
During the 1667 truce of Andrusovo, the region was under the condominium of both the Tsardom of Muscovy and the Kingdom of Poland, and in 1686, with the signing of the Treaty of Perpetual Peace, it passed under Russian suzerainty. In the 1750s, the Russian authorities sanctioned the establishment of New Serbia as a military frontier in the northwestern portion of the region, right on the border with the Polish–Lithuanian Commonwealth. Just before the Koliyivshchyna, the Russian authorities created Novorossiya Governorate, centered on Kremenchuk, which included territories of New Serbia, Slovianoserbia, and northern parts of the Zaporizhzhian region.

History 

Zaporizhzhia was the name of the territory of the Cossack state, the Zaporozhian Host, whose fortified capital was the Zaporizhian Sich. From the 15th century to the late 17th century it was fought over by Muscovy, the Polish Kingdom and the Ottoman Empire, as well as by the Hetmans of Upper Ukraine (after 1648). For most of that time it was technically controlled by Poland, but it was rarely peaceful, and was widely regarded (from the perspective of the claimant governments) as turbulent and dangerous, the refuge of outlaws and bandits. In the eyes of the vast majority of the Ukrainian people, however, it was a promised land of heroes and free men (as later described in the poetry of Taras Shevchenko). In addition to many invasions by neighbouring countries, inhabitants of the Zaporozhe had to deal with an influx of new settlers from all directions and conflicts between the szlachta (Polish nobility) and independent Cossacks, who enjoyed a kind of autonomy in the region. Further, Cossacks often raided the nearby rich lands of the Ottoman Empire, retaliating for the constant slave raids of the Tatars against Ukrainian territories as far west as Galicia, in return provoking raids by Ottoman vassals, the Tatars.

The more independent Army of Lower Zaporozhia was centered at the Old Sich (Stara Sich). In 1709, Tsar Peter I ordered the destruction of the Old Sich, forcing the Zaporozhian Cossacks to flee to Oleshky, on the Black Sea in Ottoman territory. In 1734, the Russians allowed the Cossacks to re-establish their republic as the Free Lands of the Zaporozhian Host, based at the New Sich (Nova Sich), but brought in many foreign settlers, and destroyed the Sich for good in 1775, incorporating the territory into New Russia.

In the population Zaporozhye lands in the late 1970s to early 1980s of the XVIII century after liquidation Zaporozhian Sich (1775) (uk) prevailed Ukrainians. In 1779, they accounted for 64.36% of the total population of this region. On the second the place among others ethnic group was occupied by the Greeks (13.76%), followed by Armenians (10.61%) and Russian (8.09%).

Economy 
Some historians estimate, that an average peasant's hut did not last over 10 years. In the years 1605–1633, for example, Red Ruthenian lands suffered 100,000 people taken captive by the Ottomans, and 24,000 dead; in the first half of the 17th century, the Polish–Lithuanian Commonwealth, controlling Zaporizhzhia, lost approximately 300,000 of people due to the Ottoman raids.

Legacy
It was after this region, a city of Zaporizhzhia received its name in 1921 previously known as Aleksandrovsk.

Gallery

See also 
 Reply of the Zaporozhian Cossacks
 Polish–Lithuanian Commonwealth#Voivodships of Lesser Poland
 Dmytro Yavornytsky, historian of the Zaporozhian Cossacks.
 Cossack with musket

Notes

External links

 Zaporizhia at the Encyclopedia of Ukraine
 Mytsyk, Yu. Free lands of the Zaporizhian Host, the Lower. Encyclopedia of History of Ukraine.

 
Historical regions in Ukraine